Henry Matthew Talintyre (1893–1962) was a British comic strip artist who drew the series 'The Wonderful Adventures of Jerry, Don and Snooker' for Jack and Jill between 1954 and 1958. The characters were revived from the Oojah series published in the Daily Sketch and written by their creator Flo Lancaster (Mrs. Edwardes-Jones).

Talintyre had previously contributed to the early issues of TV Comic where he coincidentally drew characters named 'Jack and Jill', unrelated to the characters in the comic of that name.

Born Gateshead Durham 1893. He died in the Chichester area of Britain in 1962, aged 69.

British comics artists
1893 births
1962 deaths